West Africa Campaign may refer to:

West Africa Campaign (World War I)
West Africa Campaign (World War II)